This is an incomplete list of ambassadors from Germany to Italy.
 1893–1897: Bernhard von Bülow
 1897–1899: Anton Saurma von der Jeltsch
 1899–1902: Karl von Wedel
 1902–1909: Anton von Monts de Mazin
 1909–1913: Gottlieb von Jagow
 1913–1915: Hans von Flotow
 1920–1921: John von Berenberg-Gossler
 1921-1930  Konstantin von Neurath
 1930-1932 Karl von Schubert
 1932-1938 Ulrich von Hassell
 1938-1942 Hans Georg von Mackensen
 1943-1944 Rudolf Rahn (to the Italian Social Republic)
 1957-1963 Manfred Klaiber
 2007–2012: Michael Steiner
 2012 – : Reinhard Schäfers

References

Italy
Germany